Mars surface could relate to :
 Geology of Mars
 Atmosphere of Mars